Stéphanie Mugneret-Béghé (born 22 March 1974) is a French former football midfielder who played for FCF Lyon and FCF Juvisy in the French First Division and the Boston Breakers in the WUSA. She was a member of the French national team for thirteen years, taking part in the 1997, 2001 and 2005 European Championships and the 2003 World Cup.

Biography 
A club, she played the colors of Juvisy FCF from 1994 to 2003 and played in the WUSA with the Boston Breakers in 2003 before finding Juvisy in 2004-2005. With Juvisy she won three French championships in 1996, 1997 and 2003 and won the 2004-2005 Women's Challenge of France.

After her career as a player, she began her career as a coach, taking charge of AS Bon Conseil's  women's team.

Titles
 4 French Leagues (1993, 1996, 1997, 2003)
 1 French Cup (2005)

References

External links
 
 

1974 births
Living people
French women's footballers
France women's international footballers
2003 FIFA Women's World Cup players
Expatriate women's soccer players in the United States
FIFA Century Club
Sportspeople from Dijon
Women's association football midfielders
Olympique Lyonnais Féminin players
Paris FC (women) players
Division 1 Féminine players
Footballers from Bourgogne-Franche-Comté
French expatriate women's footballers
French expatriate sportspeople in the United States
Boston Breakers (WUSA) players
Women's United Soccer Association players